Kenard is a fictional young drug dealer on the HBO drama series The Wire, portrayed by Thuliso Dingwall.

Series

Season 4

Kenard is frequently seen hanging out with Namond's circle of friends, often making fun of Duquan "Dukie" Weems. Kenard works with Donut and Randy Wagstaff delivering flyers on Election Day. He also works with Namond, Donut, and Byron selling drugs.

Despite being the youngest of his friends, he is consistently the most profane. Namond makes him his lieutenant and allows Kenard to store their package of narcotics. However, Kenard's street smarts allow him to see right through Namond's soft nature, and after Kenard steals the package from Namond, claims the police took it, and insults Namond, Kenard is savagely beaten by Michael. However, in the Season 4 finale, Kenard is seen working on Michael's new corner with Dukie. Kenard approached Roland "Prez" Pryzbylewski who was watching Dukie from afar, to try to sell him drugs.

Season 5

Kenard pulls a prank on the cops while working on Michael's corner, and later in the season, Kenard confronts Dukie complaining Dukie is not doing his job dealing drugs as part of Michael's crew, Kenard is unaware that Michael took Dukie off the streets so he could take care of Michael's kid brother Bug. After Kenard insults him, Dukie punches Kenard, and the two get into a brief scuffle that Dukie wins. However, Spider is also present and gives Dukie a severe beating.

Kenard and company are held at gunpoint by Omar, who is in on a mission to terrorize Marlo Stanfield's corners in an attempt to lure him into the streets. Kenard is unimpressed by the sight of Omar.

While in an alley with some friends, dousing a cat with lighter fluid and apparently planning to light it on fire, Kenard sees Omar approaching. The rest of his friends flee, but Kenard remains and then proceeds to tail Omar as Omar robs a Stanfield corner and stash house. Kenard then follows Omar into a Korean-owned corner store and shoots him in the head, instantly killing him. Shocked, Kenard drops the gun and flees. In the series finale, Kenard is shown during the closing montage, being led away by Detective Crutchfield, the detective in charge of investigating Omar's murder.

Notes

References

The Wire characters
Fictional African-American people
Fictional murderers
Television characters introduced in 2006
Drug dealers of The Wire
Child characters in television
Male characters in television